The 2016–17 Georgian Superliga was the 17th season of the Georgian Superliga since its establishment. Kutaisi were the defending champions, but could not retain the title after losing to Dinamo in the finals.

Regular season

Play-offs

Relegation play-offs

References

External links
Official Georgian Basketball Federation website

Georgian Superliga seasons
Georgia
Superliga